The Tripura women's cricket team is an Indian domestic cricket team representing the Indian state of Tripura. The team has represented the state in Women's Senior One Day Trophy (List A) and  Senior women's T20 league.

Current squad
Mouchaity Debnath (wk)
Jhumki Debnath
Nikita Debnath
Ambika Debnath
Rizu Saha
Annapurna Das (c)
Shiuli Chakraborty
Maman Rabidas
Priyanka Acharjee
Moutushi Dey
Sweety Sinha
Suravi Roy
Puja Das
Sulakshana Roy

References

Women's cricket teams in India
Cricket in Tripura